Joely Andrews (born 30 April 2002) is a Northern Irish footballer who plays as a midfielder for Glentoran and the Northern Ireland women's national team.

Career
Andrews is a member of the Northern Ireland national team. On 10 September 2020, she received her first call up to the senior Northern Ireland team. She made her debut against the Faroe Islands on 18 September, coming on as a substitute.

References

2002 births
Living people
Women's association football midfielders
Women's association footballers from Northern Ireland
Northern Ireland women's international footballers
Glentoran W.F.C. players
Women's Premiership (Northern Ireland) players
UEFA Women's Euro 2022 players
People educated at Antrim Grammar School